Kuban State Medical University is a medical school in Russia. It is located in Krasnodar, the capital of Krasnodar Krai in South Russia. Kuban State Medical University was founded by the government of the Russian Federation in 1920.

Ranking and reputation
Kuban State Medical University is ranked 12819 by Webometrics world university ranking  and 6705 by 4icu world university ranking.

History

On 4 July 1920 the Kuban-Black Sea Revolutionary Committee issued a decree opening in Kuban a state university with three faculties: Medical, Natural Science and Socio-historic. On 5 September 1920 the opening ceremony of Kuban State University took place in the presence of the Chairman of the Revolutionary Committee, Y. Poluyan. It was opened in place of the prior Diecesan Women's School of Yekaterinodar (currently Krasnodar). In 1921 Kuban State University was reformed. The Medical Faculty became Kuban Medical Institute and the other two faculties were adnexed to the Institute of People's Education, Polytechnic Institute and Pedagogic Institute. Kuban State University was reopened later in 1970 without the medical faculty.

In 1921 “Kubanski nauchni meditsinski vestnik” a regular press scientific organ of South Russia was created by the first rector of Kuban Medical Institute N.F. Melnikov-Razvedenkov. In 1930 the publication of the Journal was interrupted. Under the initiative of V.M. Pokrovski, head of Normal Physiology Department, the publication of the Journal was renewed from 1993.

In 1992 The Faculty of Higher Nurses Education was opened at Kuban Medical Institute which became later in 1997 the Municipal Medical Institute of Higher Nurses Education and went out of the structure of kuban Medical University.

In 1993 a branch of Medical Faculty of Kuban Medical University was opened in Maikop, Capital of the Republic of Adigea in south Russia.

In 1998 Two more faculties were opened at Kuban Medical University: Medico-prophylactic and Pharmacy.

Graduates
Academics of the Academy of Medical Sciences of the USSR:
 S. G. Drozdov
 M. G. Shandala
Academics of the Academy of Sciences of the Soviet Ukraine:
 A. A. Shalimov
Entrepreneurs:
 Dr. Fares Kilzie

External links
Department of Normal Physiology

References 

Universities in Krasnodar
Medical schools in Russia